David Francis Carver (born 16 April 1944) is an English former professional footballer. During his career, he made over 300 appearances in the Football League most notably for Cardiff City where he made over 200 appearances and was part of the side that won the Welsh Cup on four occasions between 1968 and 1971.

Career

Carver began his career at his hometown club Rotherham United and after establishing himself in the squad he was signed by Jimmy Scoular, then manager of Cardiff City for a fee of £11,000 in January 1966. He made his debut in a 1–1 draw with Bury and eventually formed a strong full back partnership alongside Gary Bell. His only league goal for the club came on 17 October 1970 during a 2–2 draw with Leicester City. After spending six years at Cardiff he was loaned out for a short period at Swansea City before being allowed to leave and join Hereford United in 1973, where he spent one year before finishing his playing career at Doncaster Rovers.

Honours
Cardiff City
Welsh Cup winner: 1967–68, 1968–69, 1969–70, 1970–71

References

1944 births
English footballers
Rotherham United F.C. players
Cardiff City F.C. players
Swansea City A.F.C. players
Hereford United F.C. players
Doncaster Rovers F.C. players
English Football League players
Living people
Association football defenders